Brigadier Charles Frederick Cunningham Macaskie  (26 March 1888 – 26 November 1969) was an English barrister who served as the first Chief Justice of North Borneo.

Career 
In 1910, Macaskie had remained in the British protectorate of North Borneo after the First World War ended to work as a British government official. Between 1934 and 1945, he served as the Chief Justice and Deputy Governor of North Borneo. After the Japanese occupation of British Borneo, Macaskie returned and was appointed chief civil affairs officer for the period 1945-1946 and was later made commissioner for war damage claims for the Borneo Territories between 1947 and 1951.

After he left North Borneo, Macaskie held the position of acting British judge at New Hebrides (now Vanuatu) in 1955, 1958 and 1959.

Personal life 
Macaskie' first marriage was to Maggie Winifred Mary Macaskie (née Bruce), who bore him a son in 1919, Ian Bruce Macaskie. Due to Macaskie' frequent work travels into the interior region of Borneo, his family was often left alone in the capital Jesselton. In 1922, his wife fell pregnant with a Scottish man's child. Macaskie sent the family back to England to allow Maggie to give birth in more hospitable conditions and agreed to be listed as the child's father. Later, during one of Macaskie' trip back to Kent, the couple agreed to officially separate and eventually divorced in 1926.

In 1946, Macaskie married Doris Cole-Adams (née Legg).

Honours 
  :
  Companion of the Order of St Michael and St George (CMG) (1946)

See also 
 Chief Judge of Sabah and Sarawak
 Governor of North Borneo
 North Borneo dispute

References 

1888 births
1969 deaths
Lawyers from Leeds
British colonial governors and administrators in Asia
New Hebrides judges
English barristers
British Borneo judges
Sarawak, North Borneo and Brunei judges
British Army brigadiers
British Army generals of World War I
Military personnel from Leeds
British colonial army officers
Queen's Own Royal West Kent Regiment soldiers
Members of Gray's Inn
Companions of the Order of St Michael and St George